Guillaume Rufin was the defending champion but decided not to participate.
Simone Bolelli won the title, defeating Blaž Kavčič 6–3, 6–4 in the final.

Seeds

Draw

Finals

Top half

Bottom half

References
 Main Draw
 Qualifying Draw

Cyclus Open de Tenis - Singles
2012 Singles
Cyc